Joseph Wright (born 25 August 1972) is an English film director residing in Somerset, England. His motion pictures include the literary adaptations Pride & Prejudice (2005), Atonement (2007), Anna Karenina (2012), and Cyrano (2021), the action thriller Hanna (2011), Peter Pan origin story Pan (2015), and Darkest Hour (2017), a political drama following Winston Churchill during World War II nominated for Best Picture.

Early life and career

Wright always had an interest in the arts, especially painting. He would also make films on his Super 8 camera as well as spend time in the evenings acting in a drama club. Wright is dyslexic. He went to Islington Green Secondary School, but left without any GCSEs.

He began his career working at his parents' puppet theatre, the Little Angel Theatre in Islington. He also took classes at the Anna Scher Theatre School and acted professionally on stage and camera. He spent an art foundation year at Camberwell College of Arts, before taking a degree in fine art and film at Central St Martins where he was tutored by Malcolm Le Grice and Vera Neubauer. In his last year of studies he received a scholarship to make a short film for the BBC that won several awards.

During the 1990s, he worked at Oil Factory, a music video production company based in Caledonian Road, Kings Cross. He worked on a variety of productions in numerous roles, including casting director. Here he was able to get the opportunity to direct some music videos. Alongside this, particularly on the strength of his short film work, he was also developing The End, his second short film. During this decade Wright also worked part-time as a roadie for Vegetable Vision who created visuals for various electronic music bands, such as Chemical Brothers, Darren Emerson, Underworld and Andrew Weatherall. He attributes some of the aesthetic and emotion of the UK rave scene as an influence on his work.

Television

On the success of his first short film, Wright was offered the script for the serial Nature Boy (2000). 

He followed this up with the serials Bodily Harm (2002) with Timothy Spall and the highly acclaimed Charles II: The Power and the Passion (2003) with Rufus Sewell, which won the BAFTA Award for Best Drama Serial.

In 2022, Wright began directing an eight-part adaptation of the bestselling novel M: Son of the Century, a historical novel by Antonio Scurati recounting the rise of Italian dictator Benito Mussolini.

In 2023, Wright was developing an adaptation for HBO of the bestselling non-fiction book Empty Mansions: The Mysterious Life of Huguette Clark and the Spending of a Great American Fortune about the heiress Huguette Clark, daughter of the copper baron and United States Senator William A. Clark.

Feature films
In 2005, he made the transition to feature films with the critically acclaimed adaptation of Pride & Prejudice starring Keira Knightley and Matthew Macfadyen. The film received numerous accolades including 4 Academy Award nominations (including Best Actress), 6 BAFTA nominations (Wright won the BAFTA for most promising newcomer) among  other nominations and wins.

Wright's next feature was an adaptation of Ian McEwan's Booker Prize shortlisted novel Atonement, which was released in 2007, reuniting Wright with Keira Knightley, and also stars James McAvoy and Saoirse Ronan. On 13 December 2007, the film was nominated for seven Golden Globe Awards, more than any other film that year. Though Wright himself was not nominated for director, the film received seven Academy Award nominations, winning only for Best Original Score. At the BAFTA Awards it received 14 nominations and went on to win for Best Production Design and Best Film.

His next film was The Soloist which stars Jamie Foxx and Robert Downey, Jr. It is about the "true story of musical prodigy Nathaniel Ayers, who developed schizophrenia in his second year at Juilliard and ended up homeless on the streets of downtown L.A. where he performs the violin and cello." It was to be released on 21 November 2008; however the release date was pushed back to 24 April 2009.

Wright reunited with Atonement star Saoirse Ronan for the 2011 action thriller Hanna. The title character is a 15-year-old girl trained since birth to be an assassin by her father (Eric Bana), a rogue CIA asset. The movie received mostly positive reviews with Roger Ebert calling it a "first rate thriller" in his review The film received an aggregate score of 65 from Metacritic, meaning it received generally positive reviews.

Wright directed the 2012 screen adaptation by Sir Tom Stoppard of Leo Tolstoy's classic novel Anna Karenina. The cast included Keira Knightley as Anna, Jude Law as her husband, Aaron Taylor-Johnson as her young love, Irish actor Domhnall Gleeson as Konstantin Levin, as well as Kelly Macdonald, Olivia Williams, Matthew Macfadyen, and Michelle Dockery. Saoirse Ronan and Andrea Riseborough were initially cast in the film, but dropped out and were replaced by Alicia Vikander and Ruth Wilson, respectively.

Wright then directed the 2015 prequel to Peter Pan for Warner Bros. The film starred Hugh Jackman, Garrett Hedlund, Rooney Mara, Amanda Seyfried and Levi Miller as Peter. The screenplay by actor-turned-screenwriter Jason Fuchs was from the 2013 Hollywood Black List, a selection of popular unproduced scripts. The film was negatively received by critics and was considered a commercial flop, failing to recoup its budget at the box office. Rooney Mara's casting as Tiger Lily caused a controversy, due to her being of European ancestry, while Tiger Lily is traditionally portrayed as being Native American.

Wright's 2017 film Darkest Hour covers a pivotal month in the life of former British Prime Minister Winston Churchill. The film stars Gary Oldman as Churchill, along with Ben Mendelsohn, Ronald Pickup, David Schofield, Kristin Scott Thomas, Samuel West and Lily James. Wright said the film is a rebuke to Donald Trump.

Directorial trademarks
Wright won a BAFTA award for best newcomer for Pride & Prejudice and was the youngest director to have a film open the Venice Film Festival with Atonement. According to the director's commentary on Pride & Prejudice, Wright is influenced by the work of British film director David Lean, and possessing a certain knowledge of art history, tries sometimes to compose his shots after classical paintings.

Charles II: The Power and The Passion, Pride & Prejudice, Atonement and Hanna all have long tracking shots in them. Atonement has a continuous 5-minute and 5 second shot of the Dunkirk evacuation. "Basically, I just like showing off", Wright told the audience at the Hay Festival.

Personal life
After meeting on the set of Pride & Prejudice, Wright began a relationship with actress Rosamund Pike. They were engaged from 2007 to 2008.

Wright was married to sitarist Anoushka Shankar, daughter of Ravi Shankar and half-sister of Norah Jones, from 2010 until 2019. They have two sons, born in February 2011, and February 2015. They separated in December 2017 and their divorce was finalized in September 2019 as a judge concluded that Wright had committed adultery and that his wife found living with him “intolerable.”

Since 2017, Wright has been in a relationship with American actress Haley Bennett. Their daughter was born on 27 December 2018 in Brooklyn Heights. As of 2019, the family resides in the United Kingdom in Bruton, in Somerset.

Filmography
Short film
 Crocodile Snap (1997)
 The End (1998)

Feature films

Television

Commercial work
 "Chanel No. 5: Wherever I Go" (2012)
 "Chanel No. 5: There You Are" (2012)
 "Coco Mademoiselle: Chanel" (2014)

Casting and crew

Awards and nominations

Directed Academy Award performances

References

External links

1972 births
Outstanding Debut by a British Writer, Director or Producer BAFTA Award winners
English television directors
British casting directors
Living people
Film directors from London
English-language film directors
Alumni of Central Saint Martins
People from Brooklyn Heights
English film directors
People with dyslexia